Niti Shah is the titleholder of Miss International Nepal 2017. She was declared the most popular face of EnVogue and first runner-up title in Face's House of Fashion 2013. She represented Nepal at Miss International 2017 in Japan.

Shah has also fronted the covers of TEENZ, VOW, Naari, Navyaata along several other fashion magazines. She has also walked on runway for several fashion shows - including TGIF Nepal Fashion Week.

She also participated in Miss Nepal 2017.

Filmography

References

Living people
1996 births
Miss International 2017 delegates
Miss Nepal winners
Nepalese female models
Nepalese beauty pageant winners
People from Kathmandu